Elections to Metropolitan Borough of Southwark were held in 1937. This was the last set of elections before World War II.

The borough had ten wards which returned between 3 and 8 members. Labour won all the seats.

Election result

|}

References

Council elections in the London Borough of Southwark
1937 English local elections
1937 in London